The Indiana Oxygen Company Building is a historic industrial building located at Indianapolis, Indiana.  It was built in 1930, and consists of a two-story, rectangular main building on a raised basement, with an attached one-story, "U"-shaped warehouse.  Both building are constructed of brick.  The main building features applied Art Deco style limestone and metal decoration.

It was listed on the National Register of Historic Places in 1987.

References

External links

Industrial buildings and structures on the National Register of Historic Places in Indiana
Art Deco architecture in Indiana
Industrial buildings completed in 1930
Buildings and structures in Indianapolis
National Register of Historic Places in Indianapolis